This article features the 1986 UEFA European Under-18 Championship qualifying stage. Matches were played 1984 through 1986. Eight group winners qualified for the main tournament in Yugoslavia.

It was the first time only eight teams could enter the main tournament, which means the qualifying stage became more extensive. Qualifications had been organised for several years, but these were on a smaller scale, since there was still room for sixteen teams in the main tournament.

Group 1

Group 2

Group 3

Group 4

Group 5

Group 6

Group 7

Group 8

See also
 1986 UEFA European Under-18 Championship

External links
Results by RSSSF

UEFA European Under-19 Championship qualification
Qual
Qual